Kamsali is a community in Andhra Pradesh and Telangana. Their traditional profession was as goldsmith. They were part of Viswakarma group. They are classified as Backward Class according to Reservation in the government.

See also
 Telugu castes

References

Social groups of Andhra Pradesh
Social groups of Telangana